Qozbabalı (also, Qazbabalı, Kazbabali, and Kazbabaly) is a village and municipality in the Davachi Rayon of Azerbaijan.  It has a population of 351.

References 

Populated places in Shabran District